Piapot 75H is an Indian reserve of the Piapot Cree Nation in Saskatchewan. It is fourteen quarter sections located in Townships 9, 10, and 12 in Ranges 21 and 22 west of the Second Meridian, in the vicinity of Dummer, Saskatchewan. In the 2016 Canadian Census, it recorded a population of 0 living in 0 of its 0 total private dwellings.

References

Indian reserves in Saskatchewan
Division No. 2, Saskatchewan
Piapot Cree Nation